Gambart may refer to:

 Ernest Gambart, French-born artist and print publisher in London
 Jean-Félix Adolphe Gambart, French astronomer
 Gambart (crater), named after Jean-Félix Adolphe Gambart